Pyotr Aleksandrovich Bystrov (born 15 July 1979) is a former Russian association footballer. He usually played as a central, left-sided or offensive midfielder. He has played for Russia. He grew up in St Petersburg with his mother, a ballet dancer. Though his father, a law professor, never married Elena, they both carry his surname. In 2007, Bystrov passed his law exams and wished to pursue a career as a sports lawyer working for the IOC.

Career statistics

External links 
 FC Moscow profile

Living people
1979 births
Russian footballers
Russia under-21 international footballers
Russia international footballers
Association football midfielders
FC Dynamo Moscow players
FC Saturn Ramenskoye players
FC Moscow players
FC Rubin Kazan players
FC Lokomotiv Nizhny Novgorod players
Russian Premier League players
Sportspeople from Nizhny Novgorod